Rosemary Morris is a British historian specializing in Byzantium. Morris taught medieval history at the University of Manchester from 1974 to 2003, and subsequently became a visiting fellow at the University of York.

She was chair of the Society for the Promotion of Byzantine Studies from 2008 to 2012.

Books
Morris is the author of:
The Hypotyposis of the Monastery of the Theotokos Evergetis, Constantinople (11th—12th Centuries) (with R. H. Jordan, Ashgate, 2012)
Monks and Laymen in Byzantium, 843–1118 (Cambridge University Press, 1995)
The Life and Death of Theodore Stoudites (with R.H. Jordan, Harvard University Press, 2021)

References

Living people
Year of birth missing (living people)
British women historians
20th-century British historians
21st-century British historians
20th-century British women writers
21st-century British women writers
Academics of the University of Manchester
British Byzantinists
Women Byzantinists
Scholars of Byzantine history